Digitatispora is a genus of crustlike fungi in the family Atheliaceae. The genus, circumscribed by French mycologist Gaston Doguet in 1962, contains two wood-decay species that grow on marine-submerged wood.

References

External links

Atheliales
Atheliales genera